The following is a list of the 250 municipalities (comuni) of the Province of Cuneo, Piedmont, Italy.

List

See also 
List of municipalities of Italy

References 

 01
Cuneo